Lakshminath Bezbarua (14 November 1864), was an  Assamese poet, novelist and playwright of modern Assamese literature. He was one of the literary stalwarts of the Jonaki Era, the age of romanticism in Assamese literature when through his essays, plays, fiction, poetry and satires, he gave a new impetus to the then stagnating Assamese literary caravan.

He responded to the prevailing social environment through his satirical works to bring and sustain positive changes to the former. His literature reflected the deeper urges of the people of Assam.

Confusion regarding date of birth
There is confusion regarding the date of birth of Bezbaroa and also a story behind it as told by Bezbaroa himself. In the first line of the first paragraph of the first chapter of his auto-biography Mor Jiban Xuworon (মোৰ জীৱন সোঁৱৰণ), Bezbaroa confirms outright his inability to remember his exact date of birth that his parents used to tell him. But later when he grew young and required to put his date of birth for essential records, he invented a date for the purpose viz."1868 AD, November", but was born in 1864. He writes that he would like to offer this piece of information to anyone interested in knowing about his date of birth, although he is unsure whether that information would in any way affect the balance-sheet of anyone's life. In the next line he explicitly writes that approximately translates into "I am not convinced that on hearing, knowing or composing the news of my incarnation to destroy the "Annasur" (Food Devil)  in that given year, perhaps two or four years earlier or later for that matter, the mankind shall be at any loss or profit or concede any damage."

In the very next paragraph, he went on describing in detail how and why the Bundle of Birth-Charts, kept religiously and secretly away from the kids by his parents, which contained the one, the his one he knew for certain during his childhood, was lost.

Bezbaroa has however confirmed in his auto-biography that he was born in the autumn on a full-moon night, on which "Lakhmi Puja" ( A Hindu festival of worship of Goddess Lakhmi) is celebrated in India, and to mark the coincidence, he was named by his parents as "Lakshminath" ( A name for Vishnu, the Hindu God and husband of Goddess Lakhmi). This autumn-festival celebrated in the full-moon of Ashvin usually falls in the month of October in any year. As per a NASA website data, there was only one full-moon day in the month of November 1868 and that was on 30th but that was not the day of celebration of Lakshmi puja in that year. Presently, the Assam Sahitya Sabha has settled on a date – 14 October1864, that was a full-moon night of Lakshmi Puja in India, for his date of birth.

Education
Bezbaroa received his early education Sibsagar Govt. High School at Sibsagar. Thereafter he studied for his F.A. from the City College and subsequently graduated with  B.A. from the General Assembly's Institution in Calcutta. Then he took his admission in M.A. and B.L. degrees from the University of Calcutta, but he couldn't complete them both.

Personal life
Bezbaroa married Pragyasundari Devi, a niece of the poet Rabindranath Tagore. He presided over the All Assam students conference at Guwahati in 1921.

Honours

Bezbaroa was honoured by a unique title on 29 December 1931 as'Roxoraj' (ৰসৰাজ) by Asam Sahitya Sabha  at its Sibsagar session. In the felicitation letter by Asam Sahitya Sabha, the word 'Sahityarathi' was used for the first time for Bezbaroa. Roxoraj meaning 'The King of Humour' in Assamese literature for his ever-popular satirical writings under the pen-name "Kripaabor Borbaruah", a pseudo-personality that he created and portrayed as the lead character in such works. He is also known in Assamese literary society as the Sahityarathi (সাহিত্যৰথী) which means "Charioteer of Literature" for his expertise in all branches of literature. .

He was the founding president of the Asom Chattra Sanmilan (All-Assam Students' Conference) at Lataxil, Guwahati in 1916.

He presided over the 7th annual session of Assam Sahitya Sabha held at Guwahati in 1924.

He died in Dibrugarh on 26 March at the age of seventy only a few months after he went back to live in Assam permanently. The Asom Sahitya Sabha annually observes this day Sahitya Divas.

Pragya Sundari Devi was the second daughter of Maharshi Debendranath Tagore's third son Hemendranath Tagore (1845– 1885). Pragya Sundari was the first to write a cookbook in Bangla named 'Aamish O Niramish Aahar' in three volumes which became immensely popular. She also used to edit a magazine named 'Punya'. Pragya Sundari and Laxminath's granddaughter,Rita Devi is famous Odissi dancer.

Literary career
Bezbaroa started his literary career with a farce, "Litikai" serialised from the first issue of Jonaki magazine. He wrote 8 plays, 4 farces, 3 historical works, 1 act drama, 3 biographies and 2 autobiographies. He also wrote for the children. He collected and compiled folk tales of Assam (Xadhukotha) and added on his own to the basket, quite a few new tales to the benefit of nurturing parents and babysitters. Bezbaroa was the pioneer short story writer in Assam. His short stories covered the different features from the Assamese society but with humorous sentiment. Rasaraj Bezbaroa was earmarked as a patriotic playwright while he composed three historical plays, namely- Chakradhaj Singha, Joymoti Konwori and Belimaar.

O Mur Apunar Dex, a patriotic song composed by him, is the state anthem of Assam.

Literary works

Poetry Collection:
 Kodom Koli (কদম কলি) (1913)
 Podum Koli (পদুম কলি) (1968)

Novel:
Podum Kunwori (পদুম কুৱঁৰী)

Short Story Collection:
Surobhi (সুৰভি)(Short Stories, 1909)
Xadhukothaar Kuki (সাধুকথাৰ কুঁকি)(Short Stories, 1912) 
Junbiri (জোনবিৰি)(Short Stories, 1913)
Kehukoli (কেহোঁকলি)

Children's literature:
Junuka (জুনুকা) (Folk tales, 1910)
Burhi aair xadhu (বুঢ়ী আইৰ সাধু)(Folk tales, 1911)
Kokadeuta aaru nati lora  ("Grandfather and Grandsons") (ককাদেউতা আৰু নাতি-ল'ৰা)(Folk tales, 1912)
Baakhor (বাখৰ)

Collection of satire essays:
Kripabor Barbaruar Kaakotor Tupula (কৃপাবৰ বৰবৰুৱাৰ কাকতৰ টোপোলা) (1904)
Kripabor Barbaruar Ubhutoni (কৃপাবৰ বৰবৰুৱাৰ ওভোতনি)(1909)
Barbaruar Bhabor Burburoni   (বৰবৰুৱাৰ ভাবৰ বুৰবুৰণি)
Barbaruar Buloni (বৰবৰুৱাৰ বুলনি)
Comic Plays:
Litikai (লিটিকাই)
Nomal (নোমল)
Paachani (পাচনি)
Chikarpati Nikarpati  (চিকৰপতি নিকৰপতি)

Plays:
 Joymoti Kunwari (জয়মতী কুঁৱৰী)(1915)
 Chakradhwaj Singha (চক্ৰধ্বজ সিংহ)(1915)
 Belimaar  (বেলিমাৰ)(1915)
 Litikai (লিটিকাই) (1890)
 Chikarpati-Nikarpati (চিকৰপতি-নিকৰপতি) (1913)
 Nomal (নোমল) (1913)
 Pachoni (পাচনি) (1913)

Biographies:
Dinanath Bejbaruar Xankhipto Jibon Charit (দীননাথ বেজবৰুৱাৰ সংক্ষিপ্ত জীৱন চৰিত)
Sri Sri Shankardev  (শ্ৰীশ্ৰী শংকৰদেৱ)
Mahapurush Sri Sankardev Aru Sri Madhabdev (মহাপুৰুষ শ্রীশংকৰদেৱ আৰু শ্রীমাধৱদেৱ)

Autobiographical:
Mor Jiban Sowaran (মোৰ জীৱন সোঁৱৰণ)
Patralekha, Dinalekha  (পত্ৰলেখা, দিনলেখা)

English Books:
 History of Vaishnavism in India
 Rasalila of Sri Krishna (The Baroda Lectures, 1934)
 The Religion of Love and Devotion (1968), including the Boroda lectures and two other essays.

Others:
Kaamat Kritatwa Labhibar Xanket (কামত কৃতিত্ব লভিবৰ সংকেত)
Bhagawat Katha (ভাগৱত কথা)
Bharatbarshar Buranji (ভাৰতবৰ্ষৰ বুৰঞ্জী)
Tatwa Katha (তত্ত্ব কথা)
Sri Krishnakatha  (শ্ৰীকৃষ্ণকথা)
Axomiya Bhaxa Aru Xahitya (অসমীয়া ভাষা আৰু সাহিত্য)

Editor:
Bahi (বাঁহী)

See also
 O Mur Apunar Dex
 Assamese literature
 Jonaki (magazine)
 Assamese Language Movement

References

Further reading

External links

 
 Sahityarathi Lakshminath Bezbaroa Diaries at Tezu.ernet.in.
 Lakshminath Bezbaroa at OnlineSivasagar.com
 Lakshminath Bezbaroa's writing, at indianreview.in website.  
 Among the Luminaries in Assam: A Study of Assamese Biography By Anjali Sarma.
 Sambalpur may get a language research centre – Asam Sahitya Sabha members visit poet Lakshminath Bezbaroa’s house, plan to turn it into a memorial, SUBRAT MOHANTY, The Telegraph (Calcutta),  Published on 5 April 2011.  
 Few poems in Assamese at xophura.net website.
 Chakradhaj Singha a play by Lakshminath Bezbaroa.
 HISTORY OF VAISHNAVISM IN INDIA, an article by Lakshminath Bezbaroa.
 Biography of Lakshminath Bezbaroa at  oxfordreference.com.
 ebooks of Lakshminath Bezbarua Assamese ebooks of Lakshminath Bezbaroa.

1868 births
1938 deaths
Poets from Assam
People from Nagaon district
Asom Sahitya Sabha Presidents
Novelists from Assam
City College, Kolkata alumni
Scottish Church College alumni
University of Calcutta alumni
Assamese-language poets
Assam dramatists and playwrights
20th-century Indian poets
19th-century Indian poets
19th-century Indian male writers
20th-century Indian novelists
20th-century Indian short story writers
20th-century Indian biographers
Indian autobiographers
19th-century Indian novelists
19th-century Indian short story writers
19th-century Indian biographers
20th-century Indian male writers
Writers from Assam
Writers from Northeast India